Charles Wahib "Charlie" Valdez Davao (October 7, 1934 – August 8, 2010) was a Filipino actor known for roles in film and television.

Early life
Born Carlos Wahib Davao y Valdez in Iloilo City of a Filipino mestizo of Spanish and Arab descent (Jordanian). He moved to Manila in 1954 to pursue a degree in commerce student at the University of the East. He became involved in commercial and print ad modeling as a student.

Career
Although he was attentive in school, his main goal was to engage in film acting, which he realized after a friend told him about an audition at the Sampaguita Pictures.

He did not miss the chance and passed the audition with flying colors.
In 1959, he was introduced in Isinumpa, a drama film that also starred Dolphy, and topbilled by Rick Rodrigo and Barbara Perez.

Among his most memorable performances were in 1962 film Kaming Mga Talyada, where he played gay with matinee idols the late Juancho Gutierrez and Jose Mari Gonzales, and Trudis Liit with Vilma Santos. Both films were produced by Sampaguita.

But lead roles were hard to come by because he was identified with character assignments.
Davao's biggest break came when he did Pitong Matahari, a James Bond-type of a film where he played Agent 009 in 1965.

Soon after, he was given action roles until he was assigned villain roles again. In the 70s, he also starred in several Hollywood co-produced films such as A Fistful of Feathers, Blind Rage, The Last Reunion and Women in Cages where he was billed as Charles Davis. His other films included Palengke Queen with Nora Aunor in 1982; Pedro Tunasan with Lito Lapid in 1983; Get Victor Corpus: The Rebel Soldier with Rudy Fernandez in 1987; The Rape of Virginia P. with Alma Moreno in 1989; Batas ng 45. with Fernando Poe Jr. in 1991 and Volta with Ai Ai de la Alas in 2004.

Among his films associated with Mindanao were Bad Boy from Dadiangas, starring then world champ Rolando Navarrete, and Magindanao with Muhammad Faisal, both in 1982.

He played the ultimate bad guy, Satan, in the film The Killing of Satan, starring Ramon Revilla Sr., in 1983. His last film appearance was in the 2007 film Desperadas as father of Marian Rivera's character .

He started appearing on TV in 1997 with the soap Mula sa Puso with Claudine Barretto for ABS-CBN. His last appearance on ABS-CBN was in 2009 during the Chapter 14 of ABS-CBN's primetime series, May Bukas Pa as Don Carlos, the grandfather of Abby (KC Concepcion). Davao last appeared on television in GMA shows like Darna and Rosalinda.

Personal life
Davao was married to Emma Marie Abiera, a Spanish professor at the St. Theresa's College. They have four children — Bing, Ricky, Mylene and Marlene. Mylene died in an accident when she was 5 years old. When Emma Marie died, Davao remarried to Mary Grace Iñigo, sister of late film actress and comedian Cecille "Dabiana" Iñigo. They have two children, one of them was former child star Charlon Davao.

Death
Charlie Davao died unexpectedly at Philippine General Hospital in Manila on August 8, 2010, at the age of 75. He had been suffering from colon cancer.

Filmography

Film

TV shows

References

1934 births
2010 deaths
20th-century Filipino male actors
21st-century Filipino male actors
Filipino male film actors
Filipino male television actors
Filipino people of Jordanian descent
Filipino people of Spanish descent
Deaths from cancer in the Philippines
Deaths from colorectal cancer
Filipino male comedians
Male actors from Iloilo
People from Capiz
People from Iloilo City
Visayan people
Burials at The Heritage Park
ABS-CBN personalities
GMA Network personalities